The 21st TCA Awards were presented by the Television Critics Association. Craig Ferguson hosted the ceremony on July 23, 2005, at the Beverly Hilton Hotel.

Winners and nominees

Multiple wins 
The following shows received multiple wins:

Multiple nominations 
The following shows received multiple nominations:

References

External links
Official website
2005 TCA Awards at IMDb.com

2005 television awards
2005 in American television
TCA Awards ceremonies